The Sony Ericsson Xperia X10 Mini—also known as the E10i (international) or E10a (Americas)—is a smartphone by Sony Ericsson in the Xperia series. It is the second Sony Ericsson smartphone to run the Android operating system, and also one of the smallest Android handsets to date.

The X10 Mini was first revealed on 14 February 2010. Apart from the physical dimensions, the phone also differs feature-wise as compared to the X10. Text input is done via a virtual keypad on the Mini and a full QWERTY, QWERTZ, or AZERTY slide-out keyboard on the X10 Mini pro.

Sony Ericsson Xperia X10 Mini pro

The Sony Ericsson Xperia X10 Mini pro (U20i/U20a) is an upgrade to the X10 Mini with many of the internal specifications being identical. The major differences between the original X10 Mini and X10 Mini pro is the replaceable battery, and the pro having slightly larger dimensions (3.5 × 2.0 × 0.7 inches opposed to 3.3 × 2.0 × 0.6 inches).

The X10 Mini and X10 Mini pro are designed to look similar and share functionality with the larger Xperia X10, but are internally very different devices. Both handhelds lack Sony Ericsson's "Mediascape" media-management software, but include "Timescape" as well as the proprietary "Rachael" UI.

OS upgrade
The X10 Mini/Pro (as well as the X10) originally ran Android 1.6, with an update to 2.1 being rolled out from Sunday 31 October 2010, to Tuesday 30 November 2010. The updated Xperia X10 Mini/Pro is more responsive and faster when compared to older Android version 1.6. However, Sony Ericsson has no plans to upgrade the 2010 Xperia phones beyond Android 2.1, except the X10 that was upgraded to Android 2.3.

Officially, both the X10 Mini and X10 Mini Pro can not be upgraded beyond Android 2.1, although unofficially, ports of CyanogenMod, among others, allow them to be upgraded to 2.2, 2.3, 4.0, and 4.1. These updates require rooting of the phone (which has warranty implications) and potentially flashing of a third-party kernel.

Awards
 Red Dot Product Design Award 2010
 European Mobile Phone 2010–2011

See also
 Sony Ericsson Xperia X8
 List of Android devices

References

External links

XDA Developers X10 Mini Wiki
XDA Developers X10 Mini Pro Development Forum 
Android 2.3.7 for X10mini and X10mini pro

Xperia X10 Mini
Android (operating system) devices
Mobile phones introduced in 2010
Discontinued smartphones